Maldare is a small village in Kodagu district of Karnataka state, India.

Location
Maldare is located on the forest road between Piriyapatna and Siddapura.

Distance
Madikeri, 31 km
Virajpet, 26 km
Mangalore, 175 km
Bangalore, 223 km

Post Office
There is a post office at Maldare village.  The pincode is 571523.

Suburbs and villages
 Mekur Hosakeri - 12 km
 Nanjarayapatna - 12 km
 Valnur Thyagathur - 12 km
 Thithimathi - 13 km
 Ammathi - 17 km

Demographics
The village of Maldare has a population of 2,027  and there are a total of 525 houses. 
The people here speak Kannada, Kodava thakk and Malayalam.

Schools
Ekalavya Vasathi School Balugodu
St Annes School
Minority  School

 Maldare School

References

Villages in Kodagu district